Gazda is a surname. Notable people include:

 Adam Gazda (born 1987), American soccer player
 Daniel Gazda (born 1997), Czech ice hockey player
 István Gazda (1927–2006), Hungarian philatelist
 Stanisław Gazda (1938–2020), Polish cyclist

See also

References

Hungarian-language surnames
Surnames of Slavic origin